Prest or PREST may refer to:

Prest (surname), people with the surname
PREST, centre at the University of Manchester
PrEST, a way of creating antibodies

See also

Saint-Prest
Prest v Petrodel Resources Ltd